Argentina at the 1932 Summer Olympics in Los Angeles, California was the nation's sixth appearance out of nine editions of the Summer Olympic Games. Argentina sent to the 1932 Summer Olympics its third national team, under the auspices of the Argentine Olympic Committee (Comité Olímpico Argentino), 33 athletes (all males) that competed in 30 events in 6 sports: athletics, boxing, fencing, shooting, swimming, and weightlifting. They brought home 4 Olympic medals: one gold medal in the marathon, and 2 gold medals and one silver medal in boxing.

Medalists

Argentina finished in 11th position in the final medal rankings, with three gold medals and one silver medal.

Athletics

Boxing

Men

Fencing

Five fencers, all men, represented Argentina in 1932.

Men's foil
 Roberto Larraz
 Ángel Gorordo
 Rodolfo Valenzuela

Men's team foil
 Raúl Saucedo, Roberto Larraz, Rodolfo Valenzuela, Ángel Gorordo

Men's épée
 Raúl Saucedo

Men's sabre
 Carmelo Merlo

Shooting

Two shooters represented Argentina in 1932.
Men

Swimming

Men

Weightlifting

Men

References

Nations at the 1932 Summer Olympics
1932
1932 in Argentine sport